Ian Duncan is a South African actor. He is best known for playing the role of Todd Todmore on Broken News.

Filmography

Films

Television

Video games

References

External links
 

Living people
South African male film actors
South African male television actors
Year of birth missing (living people)
Place of birth missing (living people)